The 2014 Zuiderduin Masters is a BDO/WDF darts tournament that took place in Egmond aan Zee, Netherlands.

Qualifying
The players in bold are the seeded players for the group stages. The players in italics qualified through more than one method.

Men

Women

Men results

Men's tournament

Group stage
All matches best of 9 legs. Two points are gained for every match won.
P = Played; W = Won; L = Lost; LF = Legs for; LA = Legs against; +/− = Leg difference; Pts = Points

Group A

Group B

Group C

Group D

Group E

Group F

Group G

Group H

Knockout stages

Women results

Women's tournament

Group stage
All matches best of 7 legs. Two points are gained for every match won.
P = Played; W = Won; L = Lost; LF = Legs for; LA = Legs against; +/− = Leg difference; Pts = Points

Group A

Group B

Final
Best of 3 sets.

 (1) Aileen de Graaf (71.88) 1–2  (2) Anastasia Dobromyslova (78.09)

Youth results

Youth's tournament

Group stage
All matches best of 7 legs. Two points are gained for every match won.
P = Played; W = Won; L = Lost; LF = Legs for; LA = Legs against; +/− = Leg difference; Pts = Points

Group A

Group B

Final
Best of 3 sets.

 Callan Rydz 2–0  Mike van Duivenbode

References

External links
Men at dartsdatabase.co.uk
Women at dartsdatabase.co.uk
Zuiderduin Masters Official Site at zuiderduinmasters.nl

Finder Darts Masters
Zuiderduin Masters
Zuiderduin Masters